The Bahia Emerald is one of the largest emeralds and contains the largest single shard ever found. It narrowly escaped flooding during Hurricane Katrina in 2005 during a period of storage in a warehouse in New Orleans. There was an ownership dispute after it was reported stolen in September 2008 from a secured vault in South El Monte in Los Angeles County, California. The emerald was located and the case and ownership have been settled. The stone has been valued at some $400 million, but the true value is unclear.

History
It originally was mined in 2001, in the beryl mines of north Bahia, Brazil, from which it takes its name. Bahia is an archaic form of Portuguese baía, meaning 'bay' after the bay first seen by European explorers in the 16th century.

After being moved from Brazil to the United States, various attempts were made to sell it without success. There were conflicting claims of ownership. Eventually, the emerald was seized from a gem dealer in Las Vegas and taken into the custody of the Los Angeles Sheriff's Department. After a series of legal actions, Judge John A. Kronstadt of the Los Angeles County Superior Court announced in September 2010 that he would hear the case. Anthony Thomas, among the claimants, claimed to have original ownership of the gem including claimants who have paid more than $1.3 million for the emerald.  A trial date was set for January 21, 2013, in the Los Angeles County Court. On January 29, 2014, Judge Kronstadt issued a ruling rejecting the claims of Anthony Thomas, leaving the determination of the remaining claimants for a future trial.

After a trial on March 30, 2015, in the Los Angeles Superior Court, the Honorable Michael Johnson, the judge who succeeded Judge Kronstadt in the civil case, entered a final order on June 23, 2015 determining and ruling that FM Holdings, LLC was the bona fide purchaser of the Bahia Emerald and that title to the Bahia Emerald is now held solely and exclusively by FM Holdings, LLC by a series of agency relationships and lawful transactions. All other claimants to the Bahia Emerald have either been previously dismissed, e.g., Tony Thomas, or settled their claims leaving FM Holdings, LLC, as the sole and exclusive owner of the Bahia Emerald by Judge Johnson's June 23, 2015, ruling.

On June 25, 2015, U.S. District Court Judge Colleen Kollar-Kotelly, on a request by the Department of Justice, issued a restraining order protecting the stone, arguing that it is subject to forfeiture in Brazil, where prosecutors in an upcoming criminal trial allege that two men knowingly received the stolen emerald and illegally smuggled it out of the country.

See also
 List of individual gemstones
 List of emeralds by size

References

External links
 

Individual emeralds
Robberies in the United States